Caprichromis orthognathus is a species of haplochromine cichlid.

It is found in Lake Malawi and Lake Malombe and its range includes Malawi, Mozambique, and Tanzania. It is most commonly recorded off sandy beaches at depths of around  although it can be found in either shallow or deep water. It usually remains in midwater, sometimes over rocks. It is reported to be a paedophage, ramming the heads of mouth-brooding female cichlids from underneath.

References

orthognathus
Taxa named by Ethelwynn Trewavas
Fish described in 1935
Taxonomy articles created by Polbot